The Spektors were an Australian beat, pop and rock 'n' roll band active in Perth from 1964 to mid-1966. Their co-drummer and part-time lead singer, Bon Scott, was later lead vocalist with hard rock band AC/DC, from 1974 until his death in 1980.

History
The Spektors were formed in 1964 by co-vocalists and co-drummers John Collins and Bon Scott, along with Brian Gannon on bass guitar, Murray Gracie on rhythm guitar and vocals, and Wyn Milsom on guitar. Collins and Scott would each play half a set as drummer and the other half as lead vocalist. They performed beat, pop and rock 'n' roll music.

The Spektors enjoyed local acclaim by winning the Perth heat of the national Hoadley's Battle of the Sounds competition. Their repertoire included popular songs, often originally by The Rolling Stones and The Beatles. As the band developed, Scott would step up and sing occasionally while Collins played drums, on songs such as a cover of Van Morrison's "Gloria". According to Gracie their influences were "more blues than pop – groups like the Pretty Things, Them, and The Kinks".

In October 1965 the group recorded four tracks for local TV show, Club 17, including cover versions of "Gloria", Mike Berry's "On My Mind", The Beatles' "Yesterday" and George Gershwin's "It Ain't Necessarily So". In late 1966, Milsom and Scott joined with members of local rivals The Winstons, and formed a new group, The Valentines, with Scott sharing vocal duties with Winstons' Vince Lovegrove.

Personnel 
Bon Scott – vocals, drums
John Collins - vocals, drums
Wyn Milsom – guitar    
Murray Gracie – guitar   
Brian Gannon - bass

Discography
Bon Scott with the Spektors (CD, 1992, See for Miles records)
Bon Scott with the Spektors and the Valentines (CD, 1999, See for Miles records)
These songs and interviews were pirated from the TVW channel 7 show "Club 17" by Martin Clark, who was the recording engineer at the time (october 1965).

References

General
 
Specific

Australian rock music groups
Western Australian musical groups
Musical groups established in 1964
Musical groups disestablished in 1966
1964 establishments in Australia
1966 disestablishments in Australia